Euchloe falloui, the scarce green-striped white, is a butterfly in the family Pieridae. It is found in Mauritania, Algeria, Chad, Sudan, Libya, Somalia and Arabia.

Adults are on wing from November to May, usually in two but sometimes in three generations per year.

The larvae feed on Moricandia arvensis, Moricandia sinaica, Reseda muricata, Diplotaxis acris, Schouwia thebaica and Zilla spinosa.

Subspecies
Euchloe falloui falloui (Mauritania, Algeria, Chad, Sudan, Libya, Somalia, Saudi Arabia)
Euchloe falloui saudi Larsen, 1983 (Saudi Arabia)

References

Euchloe
Butterflies described in 1867
Butterflies of Africa